Armenis Kukaj (born 11 August 1997) is an Albanian professional footballer who plays as a defender for Albanian club KF Besa Kavajë.

Career statistics

Club

References

1997 births
Living people
People from Malësi e Madhe
Albanian footballers
Association football defenders
Albania youth international footballers
Albania under-21 international footballers
KF Vllaznia Shkodër players
Luftëtari Gjirokastër players
KF Bylis players
KF Besa Kavajë players
Kategoria e Dytë players
Kategoria e Parë players
Kategoria Superiore players